James Russell Raven  LittD  FBA FSA (born 13 April 1959) is a British historian, Life Fellow of Magdalene College, University of Cambridge, Chair of the Lindemann Trust, and former Chair of the English-Speaking Union of the Commonwealth.

Biography
Born in Colchester, James Raven attended The Gilberd School in the town. He read History at Clare College, Cambridge, where he also completed his doctorate on attitudes to wealth creation. He has been a visiting fellow at several American universities and institutions including Rutgers University, The American Antiquarian Society and The Newberry Library, Chicago. He was a Fellow, successively of Pembroke College and Magdalene College Cambridge, and from 1996 a Fellow of Mansfield College, Oxford and Reader in Social and Cultural History at Oxford from 2000. In 2004 he was appointed Professor of Modern History at the University of Essex, returning to his home town. He was President of the Bibliographical Society (2020–2022) and is currently Director of the Cambridge Project for the Book Trust, and Director of the Centre for Bibliographical History and a member of the Human Rights Centre at the University of Essex

Career
In 1985 he became a Fellow of Pembroke College, Cambridge and, in 1989, also Munby Fellow in Bibliography in the University. In 1990, he moved to Magdalene College, Cambridge to be a Fellow and Director of Studies in History. In 1996 he was appointed University Lecturer in the Modern History faculty at the University of Oxford and a Fellow and Tutor of Mansfield College, Oxford. In 2000, he was appointed Reader in Social and Cultural History at Oxford.
In 2004, he returned to his home town of Colchester when appointed Professor of Modern History at the University of Essex. He was elected a Fellow of the Royal Historical Society in 2000, a Fellow of the Society of Antiquaries in 2007, and a Fellow of the Linnean Society in 2014.
He was elected a Fellow of the British Academy in 2019.

Raven has directed several major national and international research projects, including two projects sponsored by the Leverhulme Trust, 1991-2 in eighteenth-century European social history, and 1995-8, an international historical survey of publication and its reception in Great Britain 1770-1830. A further institutional award from the AHRB/British Academy 1996-2004, funded the centre at the University of Oxford researching aspects of the literary, commercial, and political topography of London circa 1690-1800 (‘Mapping the Print Culture of Eighteenth-Century London').

In 1976 Raven joined the English-Speaking Union and has been President of the Colchester Branch of the ESU since 1990 and serves as a national Governor (2000-6 and 2012-), Deputy Chairman, and since 2019, Chairman in succession to Lord Paul Boateng. He also chairs the Lindemann Trust which awards annual  Fellowships in the sciences for postdoctoral research in the US by British and Commonwealth citizens. 
Between 2010 and 2020 he served as a Trustee of Marks Hall, Essex, and the Friends of St Andrews' Fingringhoe. He is a member of the Pilgrims and the Mid-Atlantic Club.

He is the author, among other books, of   What is the History of the Book?, Publishing Business, Bookscape, The Business of Books: Booksellers and the English Book Trade 1450-1850 and Judging New Wealth: Popular Publishing and Responses to Commerce in England, 1750-1800. He is also Director of the Cambridge Project for the Book Trust (founded 1990) and a well-known writer and broadcaster on cultural and social history.

See also
 Book trade in the United Kingdom
 Books in the United Kingdom

Selected published works
 Judging New Wealth: Popular Publishing and Responses to Commerce in England, 1750-1800 (Oxford: Oxford University Press, 1992)
 The Practice and Representation of Reading in England (Cambridge: Cambridge University Press, 1996), with Helen Small and Naomi Tadmor (eds.)
 (ed.) Free Print and Non-Commercial Publishing (London and Vermont: Ashgate Press, 2000)
 The English Novel 1770-1829 2 vols.(Oxford: Oxford University Press, 2000), with Peter Garside and Rainer Schöwerling)
 London Booksellers and American Customers: Transatlantic Literary Community and the Charleston Library Society, 1748-1811 (Columbia, SC: University of South Carolina Press, 2002)
 (ed.)Lost Libraries: The Destruction of Book Collections Since Antiquity (Basingstoke: Palgrave Macmillan, 2004).
The Business of Books: Booksellers and the English Book Trade 1450-1850 (London and New Haven: Yale University Press, 2007). – awarded the De Long prize for 2008

References

1959 births
Living people
Fellows of Pembroke College, Cambridge
Academics of the University of Essex
Fellows of the British Academy
British historians
Alumni of Clare College, Cambridge
People from Colchester
Fellows of Magdalene College, Cambridge
Fellows of Mansfield College, Oxford